The 1962 World Modern Pentathlon Championships were held in Mexico City, Mexico.

Medal summary

Men's events

Medal table

See also
 World Modern Pentathlon Championships

References

 Sport123

Modern pentathlon in North America
World Modern Pentathlon Championship, 1962
World Modern Pentathlon Championship, 1962
Sports competitions in Mexico City
International sports competitions hosted by Mexico
1960s in Mexico City